Easton Stadium is a college softball stadium on the campus of the University of California, Los Angeles.  It is the home venue of the UCLA Bruins softball team. It is named for James Easton, class of 1959, who has provided significant funding for the stadium. Easton Stadium is located on the northwest corner of the campus at Sunset Boulevard and Bellagio Road.

Sunset Field
The original stadium on the site was known as Sunset Field and was constructed in 1979.  It was the home of the Bruins through 1993.

Current stadium
The current stadium was completed in 1994 and completely renovated in 2004–05, with chairback seating for 1,328 installed.

References

UCLA Bruins softball venues
College softball venues in the United States
Softball venues in Los Angeles
Sports venues in Los Angeles
University of California, Los Angeles buildings and structures
1994 establishments in California
Sports venues completed in 1994